The Nazca Plate or Nasca Plate, named after the Nazca region of southern Peru, is an oceanic tectonic plate in the eastern Pacific Ocean basin off the west coast of South America. The ongoing subduction, along the Peru–Chile Trench, of the Nazca Plate under the South American Plate is largely responsible for the Andean orogeny. The Nazca Plate is bounded on the west by the Pacific Plate and to the south by the Antarctic Plate through the East Pacific Rise and the Chile Rise respectively. The movement of the Nazca Plate over several hotspots has created some volcanic islands as well as east–west running seamount chains that subduct under South America. Nazca is a relatively young plate both in terms of the age of its rocks and its existence as an independent plate having been formed from the break-up of the Farallon Plate about 23 million years ago. The oldest rocks of the plate are about 50 million years old.

Boundaries

East Pacific and Chile Rise

A triple junction, the Chile Triple Junction, occurs on the seafloor of the Pacific Ocean off Taitao and Tres Montes Peninsula at the southern coast of Chile. Here, three tectonic plates meet: the Nazca Plate, the South American Plate, and the Antarctic Plate.

Peru–Chile Trench

The eastern margin is a convergent boundary subduction zone under the South American Plate and the Andes Mountains, forming the Peru–Chile Trench. The southern side is a divergent boundary with the Antarctic Plate, the Chile Rise, where seafloor spreading permits magma to rise. The western side is a divergent boundary with the Pacific Plate, forming the East Pacific Rise. The northern side is a divergent boundary with the Cocos Plate, the Galapagos Rise.

The subduction of the Nazca plate under southern Chile has a history of producing massive earthquakes, including the largest ever recorded on earth, the moment magnitude 9.5 1960 Valdivia earthquake.

Intraplate features

Hotspots

A second triple junction occurs at the northwest corner of the plate where the Nazca, Cocos, and Pacific Plates all join off the coast of Colombia. Yet another triple junction occurs at the southwest corner at the intersection of the Nazca, Pacific, and Antarctic Plates off the coast of southern Chile. At each of these triple junctions an anomalous microplate exists, the Galapagos Microplate at the northern junction and the Juan Fernandez Microplate at the southern junction. The Easter Island Microplate is a third microplate that is located just north of the Juan Fernandez Microplate and lies just west of Easter Island.

Aseismic ridges

It is being subducted under South America with the rest of the Nazca Plate.

Plate motion
The subducting Nazca Plate, which exhibits unusual flat slab subduction, is tearing as well as deforming as it is subducted (Barzangi and Isacks). The subduction has formed, and continues to form, the volcanic Andes Mountain Range. Deformation of the Nazca Plate even affects the geography of Bolivia, far to the east (Tinker et al.).

Aside from the Juan Fernández Islands, this area has very few other islands that are affected by the earthquakes that are a result of complicated movements at these junctions.

Geologic history

The precursor of the Nazca Plate, Juan de Fuca Plate, and the Cocos Plate was the Farallon Plate, which split in the late Oligocene, about 22.8 Mya, a date arrived at by interpreting magnetic anomalies. Subduction under the South American continent began about 140 Mya, although the formation of the high parts of the Central Andes and the Bolivian orocline did not occur until 45 Mya. It has been suggested that the mountains were forced up by the subduction of the older and heavier parts of the plate, which sank more quickly into the mantle.

See also
2010 Chile earthquake
Caribbean Plate

References

Bibliography
Extreme Science site: "A Lesson in Plate tectonics" The basics explained.
Galapagos rise junction (map)
Juan Fernandez and Easter microplate (map)
Muawia Barazangi and Bryan L. Isacks, "Spatial distribution of earthquakes and subduction of the Nazca plate beneath South America" in Geology Vol. 4, No. 11, pp. 686–692. Abstract
Mark Andrew Tinker, Terry C. Wallace, Susan L. Beck, Stephen Myers, and Andrew Papanikolas, "Geometry and state of stress of the Nazca plate beneath Bolivia and its implication for the evolution of the Bolivian orocline" in Geology 24(5), pp. 387–390 Abstract
Cahill, T. and B. Isacks (1992). "Seismicity and shape of the subducted Nazca plate." Journal Geophysical Research 97 (12)
James, D. (1978). "Subduction of the Nazca plate beneath Central Peru." Geology 6 (3) pp 174–178
Martin Meschede and Udo Barckhausen, "Plate tectonic evolution of the Cocos-Nazca spreading center"

Tectonic plates
Geology of Chile
Natural history of Oceania
Natural history of South America
Geology of the Pacific Ocean